Ragazzi's fan-footed gecko (Ptyodactylus ragazzii), also known commonly as the Sahelian fan-toed gecko, is a species of lizard in the family Phyllodactylidae. The species is endemic to northern Africa.

Etymology
The specific name, ragazzii, is in honor of Italian physician Vincenzo Ragazzi (1856–1929) of the Modena Natural History Society.

Geographic range
P. ragazzii is found in Algeria, Benin, Burkina Faso, Cameroon, Chad, Djibouti, Egypt, Ethiopia, Ghana, Libya, Mali, Mauritania, Niger, Nigeria, Somalia, Sudan, and Togo.

Habitat

Behavoir
P. ragazzii is nocturnal, crepuscular, and rupicolous.

Reproduction
P. ragazzii is oviparous. Clutch size is two eggs. An adult female may lay as many as six clutches per year.

References

Further reading
Anderson J (1898). Zoology of Egypt: Volume First. Reptilia and Batrachia. London: Bernard Quaritch. lxv + 371 pp. + Plates I-XXX. (Ptyodactylus hasselquistii Var. ragazzi, new variety, p. 69 + Plate VII, figures 10 & 11).
Rösler H (1995). Geckos der Welt: Alle Gattungen. Leipzig: Urania Verlag. 256 pp. . (Ptyodactylus ragazzii, p. 151). (in German).
Schleich HH, Kästle W, Kabisch K (1996). Amphibians and Reptiles of North Africa. Koenigstein, Germany: Koeltz Scientific Books. 630 pp. . (Ptyodactylus ragazzii, new status, p. 244).
Sindaco R, Jeremčenko VK (2008). The Reptiles of the Western Palearctic. 1. Annotated Checklist and Distributional Atlas of the Turtles, Crocodiles, Amphisbaenians and Lizards of Europe, North Africa, Middle East and Central Asia. (Monographs of the Societas Herpetologica Italica). Latina, Italy: Edizioni Belvedere. 580 pp. . 

Ptyodactylus
Reptiles described in 1898